Vincent James Squillante, also known as Jimmy Jerome (June 7, 1919 – disappeared September 23, 1960), was an American New York mobster who belonged to the Gambino crime family and was known as "king of the garbage collection racket". Squillante also worked as an assassin for mob boss Albert "Mad Hatter" Anastasia.

Biography
Squillante was born to Luigi and Bedelia Alberti, one of two sons, the other being Nunzio and seven sisters. He stood at 5-foot-2 and weighed 130 pounds. He married Theresa Scialabba in 1949 and fathered one child, Bedelia. He divorced Theresa in 1951 and married Olivia Hughes and fathered two daughters with her, Donna and Olivia. He is the uncle to mobster Jerry Mancuso. In 1963, Government informant Joe Valachi claimed that Squillante participated in the 1957 slaying of Anastasia underboss Frank "Don Cheech" Scalise. After the murder, Scalise's brother Joe publicly declared that he would avenge Frank's death. However, the Gambino family did not support Joe's declaration, possibly due to Anastasia's opposition. As a result, Joe was forced into hiding for several months until the family ostensibly forgave him. On September 7, 1957, according to Valachi, Squillante invited Joe to his house. Once Joe arrived, Squillante and several others murdered him, dismembered his body, loaded the remains onto one of Squillante's garbage trucks, and dumped them.

In fall 1960, Squillante was indicted on extortion charges. Reportedly, the Gambino family worried that Squillante could not handle the upcoming trial and probable prison sentence. So, to "put him out of his misery," the family ordered Squillante's death. On September 23, 1960, Squillante disappeared. According to some accounts, Squillante was handcuffed live to the steering wheel of a rusty Chevrolet and the car was moved into a baling press type compactor. The metal was then melted down in an open hearth furnace. However, some newspaper accounts of that period claim that Squillante was seen on September 30 at 2 a.m. driving around the Bronx in his brother-in-law's car. Squillante's body was never found and no murder suspects were ever arrested.

See also
List of fugitives from justice who disappeared

Notes and references

Notes

General references 
Devito, Carlo. Encyclopedia of International Organized Crime. New York: Facts On File, Inc., 2005. 
Fox, Stephen. Blood and Power: Organized Crime in Twentieth-Century America. New York: William Morrow and Company, 1989. 
Kelly, Robert J. Encyclopedia of Organized Crime in the United States. Westport, Connecticut: Greenwood Press, 2000. 
Sifakis, Carl. The Mafia Encyclopedia. New York: Da Capo Press, 2005. 
Sifakis, Carl. The Encyclopedia of American Crime. New York: Facts on File Inc., 2001. 
 Mafia: The Government's Secret File On Organized Crime

Further reading
Capeci, Jerry. The Complete Idiot's Guide to the Mafia. Indianapolis: Alpha Books, 2002. 
Davis, John H. Mafia Dynasty: The Rise and Fall of the Gambino Crime Family. New York: HarperCollins, 1993.
Jacobs, James B., Coleen Friel and Robert Radick. Gotham Unbound: How New York City Was Liberated from the Grip of Organized Crime. New York: NYU Press, 2001. 
Raab, Selwyn. Five Families: The Rise, Decline, and Resurgence of America's Most Powerful Mafia Empires. New York: St. Martin Press, 2005. 
Reuter, Peter. Racketeering in Legitimate Industries: A Study in the Economics of Intimidation. 1987.
United States. Congress. Senate. Select Committee on Improper Activities in the Labor or Management Field. Investigation of Improper Activities in the Labor Or Management Field: Index to Hearings Before the Select Committee on Improper Activities in the Labor or Management Field. 1959. 
United States. Congress. Senate. Committee on Governmental Affairs. Permanent Subcommittee on Investigations. Organized Crime: 25 Years After Valachi: Hearings Before the Permanent Subcommittee on Investigations. 1988. 
United States. Congress. Senate. Government Operations Committee. Organized Crime and Illicit Traffic in Narcotics: Hearings before the Government Operations Committee. 1964. 
United States. Congress. Senate. Committee on Governmental Affairs. Permanent Subcommittee on Investigations. Profile of Organized Crime, Mid-Atlantic Region: Hearings Before the Permanent Subcommittee on Investigations. 1983.

External links
TIME.com - Taking Out the Garbage

1919 births
1960 deaths
1960s missing person cases
Criminals from New York City
Missing gangsters
Gambino crime family
Murdered American gangsters of Italian descent